Twenty-one men's teams competed in basketball at the 1936 Summer Olympics.

Belgium

The following players represented Belgium:

Brazil

The following players represented Brazil:

 Baiano
 Américo Montanarini
 Armando Albano
 Pavão
 Carmino de Pilla
 Miguel Lopes
 Nelson de Souza
 Coroa

Canada

The following players represented Canada:

 Gord Aitchison
 Ian Allison
 Art Chapman
 Chuck Chapman
 Doug Peden
 Jimmy Stewart
 Red Wiseman
 Ed Dawson
 Toots Meretsky

Chile

The following players represented Chile:

 Luis Carrasco
 Augusto Carvacho
 José González
 Eusebio Hernández
 Luis Ibaseta
 Eduardo Kapstein
 Michel Mehech

China

The following players represented China:

Czechoslovakia

The following players represented Czechoslovakia:

 Alois Dvořáček
 Hubert Prokop
 František Hájek
 František Picek
 Jiří Čtyřoký
 Josef Klíma
 Josef Moc
 Karel Kuhn
 Ladislav Prokop
 Ladislav Trpkoš
 Ludvík Dvořáček
 Vítězslav Hloušek

Egypt

The following players represented Egypt:

 Abdel Moneim Wahibi
 Albert Tadros
 Edward Risk Allah
 Gamal El-Din Sabri
 Jwani Riad Noseir
 Kamal Riad Noseir
 Rashad Shafshak

Estonia

The following players represented Estonia:

Head coach: Herbert Niiler

France

The following players represented France:

 Edmond Leclerc
 Étienne Onimus
 Fernand Prudhomme
 Georges Carrier
 Jacques Flouret
 Jean Couturier
 Lucien Thèze
 Pierre Boël
 Pierre Caque
 Robert Cohu
 Étienne Rolland

Germany

The following players represented Germany:

 Bernhard Cuiper
 Emil Göing
 Emil Lohbeck
 Hans Niclaus
 Heinz Steinschulte
 Karl Endres
 Kurt Oleska
 Otto Kuchenbecker
 Robert Duis
 Siegfried Reischies

Italy

The following players represented Italy:

 Adolfo Mazzini
 Ambrogio Bessi
 Egidio Premiani
 Emilio Giasetti
 Enrico Castelli
 Galeazzo Dondi
 Giancarlo Marinelli
 Gino Basso
 Livio Franceschini
 Mario Novelli
 Mike Pelliccia
 Remo Piana
 Sergio Paganella

Japan

The following players represented Japan:

 Kenshichi Yokoyama
 Masayasu Maeda
 Chang Ri-jin
 Satoshi Matsui
 Seikyu Ri
 Takao Nakae
 Takehiko Kanagoki
 Uichi Munakata

Latvia

The following players represented Latvia:

 Voldemārs Elmūts
 Rūdolfs Jurciņš
 Maksis Kazāks
 Visvaldis Melderis
 Džems Raudziņš
 Eduards Andersons
 Mārtiņš Grundmanis

Mexico

The following players represented Mexico:

Peru

The following players represented Peru:

Head coach: Pedro Vera as playing coach

Philippines

The Philippines had a squad of 12 players.

Head coach: Dionisio Calvo

Poland

The following players represented Poland:

Head coach: Walenty Kłyszejko

Switzerland

The following players represented Switzerland:

Head coach:

Turkey

The following players represented Turkey:

 Dionis Sakalak
 Jack Habib
 Hayri Arsebük
 Naili Moran
 Nihat Ertuğ
 Hazdayi Penso
 Sadri Usluoğlu
 Şeref Alemdar

United States

The following players represented the United States:

Head coach: Jimmy Needles (Universal Pictures (CA))

Uruguay

The following players represented Uruguay:

 Alejandro González
 Carlos Gabín
 Gregorio Agós
 Humberto Bernasconi
 Leandro Gómez
 Prudencio de Pena
 Rodolfo Braselli
 Tabaré Quintans
 Víctor Latou

References

External links
 Olympic Report
 

1936 Summer Olympics